Pangani Town is a historic Swahili settlement located on the south eastern shore of Tanga Region, Tanzania. It is the headquarters of the Pangani District. Administrately the town Pangani is situated within two wards, Pangani Mashariki and Pangani Magharibi. The town is currently the largest settlement in Pangani district and is a major tourist attraction in Tanga region and is a Tanzanian National Histotic Site.

History
Archaeologists have found the remains of small 15th century settlements on the bluffs just north of Pangani, but the modern town came to prominence in the 19th century, when, under nominal Zanzibari rule, it was a major terminus of caravan routes to the deep interior. From the 1860s onward townspeople established large plantations of sugar and coconut in Mauya, along the banks of the river just west of town.

The plantations were worked by slave labor, and Pangani also became an important center of the slave trade, shipping captives taken in the wars attendant on the collapse of the Shambaa kingdom in the Usambara mountains to the plantations of Pemba and Zanzibar. After Sultan Barghash bin Said of Zanzibar signed treaties with Great Britain outlawing the ocean-going trade in slaves in 1873, Pangani became a center for smuggling slaves across the narrow channel to Pemba, in evasion of Royal Navy warships.

In 1888, Pangani was the center of an armed movement to resist German colonial conquest of the mainland Tanzanian coast. The local leader of the resistance was Abushiri ibn Salim al-Harthi, a Swahili-speaker born in Zanzibar who owned a small estate at the suburb that now bears his name. Abushiri was instrumental in coordinating resistance to German conquest along much of the coast. The Germans hanged him at Pangani in December 1889.

Several historical sites in and around the town serve as reminders of the strong Arabic influence and later colonial era of German East Africa and British Tanganyika Territory. The district boma or headquarters is the most impressive building remaining from the period of Zanzibari rule.

On 13 July 1916 the Royal Navy monitor  bombarded Pangani. On 23 July the Germans surrendered the town to British land and naval forces.

Economy
The Mauya plantations no longer grow sugar, but produce much coconut and betel-nut. Pangani was once a secondary center of the sisal industry, servicing sisal plantations to the north and south of town. Pangani also has a fishing industry. In recent years beach resorts north and south of the town have brought tourists. The town is a district headquarters. Its hospital draws patients from many parts of the region. Funguni Secondary School is in Pangani Town and Boza Secondary School is a short distance north.

See also
Historic Swahili Settlements

Sources
 R.M. Gramly, "Archaeological reconnaissance at Pangani Bay," Tanzania Notes and Records, 86/87 (1981), 17–28.
 Jonathon Glassman, Feasts and Riot: Revelry, Rebellion, and Popular Consciousness on the Swahili Coast, 1856-1888 (Portsmouth: Heinemann; Dar es Salaam: Mkuki na Nyota; Nairobi: EAEP, 1995).

References

External links

Swahili people
Swahili city-states
Swahili culture
Populated places in Tanga Region